Molay may refer to:
Persons
 Jacques de Molay (c. 1240–1314), the last Grand Master of the Knights Templar, who fought in Syria
 Mulay or Molay, Mongol general circa 1300 who was active in Syria and Palestine

Places
 Molay, Jura, a commune in the French department of Jura
 Molay, Haute-Saône, a commune in the French department of Haute-Saône
 Môlay, a commune in the French department of Yonne
 Le Molay-Littry, a commune in the French department of Calvados

Organizations
DeMolay International, social fraternity sponsored by Freemasons